The three-lined kukri snake (Oligodon trilineatus) is a species of snake of the family Colubridae.

Geographic range
The snake is found in Indonesia. Specifically, it is widespread in the mainland and islands of Sumatra.

References 

Reptiles described in 1854
Taxa named by André Marie Constant Duméril
Taxa named by Gabriel Bibron
Taxa named by Auguste Duméril
Reptiles of Indonesia
Colubrids
trilineatus